Goran Ivanišević defeated Guy Forget in the final, 7–6(7–2), 4–6, 7–6(7–5), 6–2 to win the singles tennis title at the 1992 Stockholm Open.

Boris Becker was the two-time defending champion, but lost in the quarter-finals to Ivanišević.

Seeds

Draw

Finals

Top half

Section 1

Section 2

Bottom half

Section 3

Section 4

External links
 1992 Stockholm Open draw

Singles